Keshari Devi Patel is an Indian politician. She was elected to the Lok Sabha, lower house of the Parliament of India from Phulpur, Uttar Pradesh in the 2019 Indian general election as a member of the Bharatiya Janata Party. Earlier, she had lost 2004 Lok Sabha election from Phulpur and 2014 Lok Sabha election from Allahabad as a Bahujan Samaj Party candidate. Later she joined BJP.

Personal life
Keshari Devi was born to Hanuman Das Singh and Dhanpati Devi on 1 January 1957 in Dabwa Khandeha village of Chitrakoot district, Uttar Pradesh. She did her Masters of Arts post graduation in from Awadhesh Pratap Singh University in Rewa, Madhya Pradesh. She married Gulab Singh on 17 February 1973, with whom she has three sons.

References

External links
Official biographical sketch in Parliament of India website

1957 births
Living people
India MPs 2019–present
Lok Sabha members from Uttar Pradesh
Bharatiya Janata Party politicians from Uttar Pradesh
People from Chitrakoot district
People from Rewa, Madhya Pradesh
People from Allahabad district
Bahujan Samaj Party politicians from Uttar Pradesh